The following are the national records in Olympic weightlifting in Argentina. Records are maintained in each weight class for the snatch lift, clean and jerk lift, and the total for both lifts by the Federación Argentina de Pesas.

Current records

Men

Women

Historical records

Men (1998–2018)

Women (1998–2018)

 Koppel was not part of the official competition as Argentina is not an African country and her results were not recorded by the IWF. It's unclear why and how Koppel competed there.

References
General
Argentine records – Men July 2022 updated
Argentine records – Women July 2022 updated
Specific

External links
 Argentinian Weightlifting Federation website
Historical records 

Argentina
Records
Olympic weightlifting
weightlifting